Arthur Perkins (1864–1932) was an American lawyer and judge from Hartford, Connecticut who, during his retirement, spearheaded the effort to make Benton MacKaye's vision of the Appalachian Trail—a proposed 2,000-mile contiguous footpath to run through fourteen states—a reality.

Perkins appointed himself acting chairman of the Appalachian Trail Conference (ATC, now known as the Appalachian Trail Conservancy) in the 1920s, and along with Myron Avery, rallied interest and involvement. The New York segment of the trail had been built in 1923, but work stalled until 1929, when Perkins found a willing worker in his home state. He tapped Ned Anderson to map Connecticut's 50-mile leg. It was quickly accomplished between 1929 and 1933.

Judge Perkins was also a dynamic leader in the Connecticut Forest and Park Association (CFPA). He was a member of its Blue Blazed Trails Committee, under whose auspices Anderson worked. This committee was responsible for creating a series of walking trails throughout the state. CFPA maintains over 800 miles of blue-blazed trails to date.

An avid outdoorsman, JP, as he was known to his friends, also became a mountaineer later in life, joining the Appalachian Mountain Club when he was in his fifties.  However, his health began to fail him in the early 1930s and Myron Avery took over the ATC chairmanship. Progress in Connecticut had inspired enthusiasm and the Appalachian Trail grew. The entire route was completed in 1937.

Prior to his involvement with the Appalachian Trail Committee, Perkins had been a graduate of Yale. In 1889 he took over the reins of the family law firm, Perkins & Perkins, from his father, Charles Perkins, and remained in charge until his death in 1932.  Founded by Arthur's grandfather, Enoch Perkins, in 1786, the firm is now known as Howard, Kohn, Sprague & Fitzgerald, and it is the oldest law firm in continuous practice in the United States.

On June 17, 2011 he was inducted into the Appalachian Trail Hall of Fame at the Appalachian Trail Museum as a charter member.

References

External links
Appalachian Trail Conservancy
National Park Service Appalachian National Scenic Trail

Appalachian Trail
Hikers
Lawyers from Hartford, Connecticut
1864 births
1932 deaths
Yale University alumni
Connecticut state court judges